Calocochlea pan  is a species of large air-breathing land snail, a pulmonate gastropod mollusk in the family Camaenidae.

This species is very common in the Philippines. The shell is between 41 and 47 millimeters long with brown spiral bands and a cream-colored background.

References

External links
Broderip, W. J. (1841). Descriptions of shells collected by H. Cuming, Esq., in the Philippine Islands. Proceedings of the Zoological Society of London. 9: 22-23, 34-35, 36-38, 44-46
 Richardson, L. (1983). Bradybaenidae: Catalog of species. Tryonia. 9: 1-253
 Animal Life Forms: Calocochlia pan
 BioLib:Calocochlia pan W. J. Broderip, 1841
 ZipcodeZoo.com: Calocochlia pan

Camaenidae
Gastropods described in 1841